, formerly known as Daigo Stardust, is a Japanese singer-songwriter, actor, talent, and voice actor. He debuted in 2003 as Daigo Stardust under Victor Entertainment. In 2007, he formed the rock band Breakerz. With the solo debut of Akihide, Daigo continued his solo project in 2013, but dropped the pseudonym surname "Stardust".

His best known acting role was as Yukichi Oishi in Love Shuffle.

Personal life

1978–2001: Early Life
Daigo was born April 8, 1978, in Nakano, Tokyo. He lived in Ichikawa, Chiba from age 3 to the summer of third grade. He moved back to Tokyo after his grandfather, Noboru Takeshita became the Prime minister of Japan. He attended Tamagawa Gakuen. He attended Tamagawa University Department of Arts, but dropped out. He developed a love of music at a young age when he listened to the Japanese rock band Boøwy and tried to learn the classical guitar, which he immediately quit to self study the electric guitar instead. He was also a fan of B'z, a major group under Daigo's current label. He formed a cover band for them in high school. He began voice training during his third year in high school, and formed the band JZEIL, and performed at his high school festival before graduating. At that time, various visual bands were active, and blond hair, flashy makeup, and sexy costumes were trademarks. JZEIL grew in popularity and was expected to make a professional debut, but that did not occur and the band was dissolved on September 25, 2001.

2001–2007: DAIGO☆STARDUST
After the band disbanded, he started his activity as a solo singer with the name "DAIGO with The space toys" At age 25, with the help of photographer Katou Masonori, he made his debut as DAIGO☆STARDUST on July 21, 2003, deriving the name from David Bowie's Ziggy Stardust persona.

Family
His maternal grandfather was Noboru Takeshita, the former prime minister of Japan, and his older sister is Eiko Naitō, a manga artist who is best known as Eiki Eiki.

He married Keiko Kitagawa, who played Sailor Mars in the live-action series Sailor Moon, on January 11, 2016.

Filmography

Film
Kimi ga Odoru, Natsu (September 2010) as Tomoya Ishiguro
Ultraman Saga (March 2012) as Taiga Nozomu/Ultraman Zero
Stand Up! Vanguard (September 2012) as himself
Cardfight!! Vanguard: The Three Games (August 2014) as himself
The Lies She Loved (2017) as Kimura
Nisekoi (2018) as Claude
Fortuna's Eye (2019) as Kazuyuki Utsui
Love Stage!! (2020) as Shōgo Sena (reprising his role from the anime)

Drama
 Love Shuffle as Yukichi Oishi
 Stand Up!! as Shin
 Higanbana - Keishicho Sosa Nana ka as Kento Kikuchi
 Eigyo Bucho Kira Natsuko as Yoshio Kawahara

Anime
Detective Conan: The Raven Chaser (April 2009) as Kōsuke Mizutani
Cardfight!! Vanguard (August 2012) as himself
Love Stage!! (July 2014) as Shōgo Sena
Cardfight!! Vanguard G: GIRS Crisis (December 2015) as himself
Lu Over The Wall (May 2017) as Esojima
D4DJ First Mix (October 2020) as Kū Mitsuhashi
Anpanman: Dororin and the Transforming Carnival (June 2022) as Demon King Makkuro

Dubbing
Wanted (2008) as Wesley Gibson
Sodor's Legend of the Lost Treasure (April 2016) as Ryan
Mission: Impossible – Fallout (2019) as August Walker

Discography

Singles (In BREAKERZ)
 SUMMER PARTY / LAST EMOTION (2008.07.09) No. 10
  (2008.09.24) No. 6
 Angelic Smile / WINTER PARTY (2008.11.05) No. 9
 GRAND FINALE (2009.18.02) No. 6
  (2009.08.04) No. 2
  (2009.07.15) No. 6
  (2009.11.04) No. 5
  (2010.07.14) No. 5
 BUNNY LOVE / REAL LOVE 2010 (2010.11.03) No. 4
  (2011.04.27) No. 5
  (2011.07.13) No. 8
 Miss Mystery in Case Closed or Detective Conan (2012.01.25) No. 5
  (2012.06.13) No. 5
 RUSTY HEARTS (2013.01.16) No. 6
 WE GO in Case Closed or Detective Conan (2015.05.20) No. 9
 YAIBA in Cardfight!! Vanguard G: GIRS Crisis

As DAIGO☆STARDUST
 MARIA (2003.07.21)
 (2003.10.22)
 ROCK THE PLANET (2004.04.21)
 (2004.07.21)
 SCAPEGOAT (2005.06.22)
 SUPERJOY (2005.09.22)

As Daigo
  (2013.07.31)
 
 Deing (2018.12.05)

Albums (In BREAKERZ)
 BREAKERZ (2007.07.25) did not chart
 CRASH & BUILD (2007.12.05) No. 300
 BIG BANG! (2008.11.26) No. 8
 FIGHTERZ (2009.12.02) No. 7
 GO (2011.09.21) No. 3
 0 -ZERO- (2015.07.29) No. 13

Mini Albums (In BREAKERZ)
  (2008.04.02) No. 123
 B.R.Z ACOUSTIC (2010.04.08) No. 9

As DAIGO☆STARDUST
 The space toy (2003.11.21)
 HELLO CRAZY GENTLEMAN (2005.11.23)
 DAIGO☆STARDUST BEST (2009.02.25)

References

External links
Daigo official website  
Daigo official blog 
Daigo Stardust official website 
Breakerz official website 

1978 births
Japanese male singer-songwriters
Japanese singer-songwriters
Japanese male actors
Japanese television personalities
Living people
Singers from Tokyo
Being Inc. artists
Victor Entertainment artists
21st-century Japanese singers
21st-century Japanese male singers